Enver Koso (born 5 May 1956) is a Bosnian handball player. He competed in the men's tournament at the 1980 Summer Olympics.

References

External links
 

1956 births
Living people
Bosnia and Herzegovina male handball players
Olympic handball players of Yugoslavia
Handball players at the 1980 Summer Olympics
People from Goražde